Mibtahiah  (476 BC - before 416 BC), was a Jewish businesswoman and banker. She belonged to the first Jewish women of which there is any information outside of the Bible as well as the first of Jewish businesswomen, and she has been the subject of research. She is well documented from the Ancient Arameic papyrus collections from Elephantine in Egypt, known as the Mond-Cecil papyri in the Cairo Museum and the Bodleian papyri, which is also named the Mibtahiah archive after her.

References

 J. Cheryl Exum: The Historical Books
 Joseph Mélèze Modrzejewski: The Jews of Egypt: From Rameses II to Emperor Hadrian

Ancient businesswomen
5th-century BC Egyptian people
5th-century BC Egyptian women
5th-century BCE Jews
Ancient Jewish women